Jach'a Walluni (Aymara jach'a big, wallu rocks, cliffs, -ni a suffix, "the one with big cliffs" or "the big one with cliffs", also spelled Jachcha Hualluni) is a mountain in the Bolivian Andes which reaches a height of approximately . It is located in the La Paz Department, Loayza Province, Luribay Municipality. Jach'a Walluni lies northwest of Jach'a Wayllani and Tani Tani.

References 

Mountains of La Paz Department (Bolivia)